Pierre-Luc Gagnon, commonly known by his initials, PLG (born May 2, 1980 in Boucherville, Quebec), is a Canadian professional skateboarder.

Gagnon began skating in 1988, and entered his first competition in 1992.

A frequent participant in the X-Games, he has won nineteen medals (nine gold) in the Vert, Vert Double, Big Air and Vert Best Trick categories. He has also been victorious on the Dew Tour and in the Gravity Games, and was the winner of the vert division of the Maloof Money Cup with a wide array of technical flip tricks and spins including a nollie heelflip indy 540.

Gagnon won the Skateboard Vert at the AST China Invitational in Beijing in 2008. He won his third successive X-Games gold medal and fifth overall, in 2010. Shortly after, he won his second Maloof Money Cup skateboard vert competition.

His sponsors include Darkstar skateboards, RDS clothing, Osiris Footwear, Electric visual, Monster energy drink, BOOM Headphones, Capix helmets and Harley-Davidson Motor Company.

Gagnon was a part of the cast in a VH1 reality series titled The X-Life.

Competition wins
2002 X Games
2002 Gravity Games
2005 X Games
2008 AST Chinese Invitational
2008 X Games
2008 Maloof Money Cup
2009 X Games
2010 X Games
2010 Maloof Money Cup
2011 Dew Cup
2012 X Games
2015 X Games

References

12 https://web.archive.org/web/20150608015146/http://www.rds.ca/sports-extr%C3%AAmes/jeux-extr%C3%AAmes-d-%C3%A9t%C3%A9-le-qu%C3%A9b%C3%A9cois-pierre-luc-gagnon-remporte-l-%C3%A9preuve-de-rouli-roulant-sur-rampe-1.2410513

External links
Gagnon's official website.
Gagnon's bio on ESPN.

Canadian skateboarders
Sportspeople from Quebec
Living people
1980 births
X Games athletes
People from Boucherville
French Quebecers